Wallace is a census-designated place and unincorporated community in northwestern Marlboro County, South Carolina, United States. It lies at the intersection of U.S. Route 1 with SC 9 and SC 177, northwest of the city of Bennettsville, the county seat of Marlboro County. Its elevation is 151&feet (46 m). Although Wallace is unincorporated, it has a post office, with the ZIP code of 29596; the ZCTA for ZIP code 29596 had a population of 2,606 at the 2000 census.

Pegues Place was listed on the National Register of Historic Places in 1971.

Demographics

References

Census-designated places in Marlboro County, South Carolina
Unincorporated communities in South Carolina
Census-designated places in South Carolina
Unincorporated communities in Marlboro County, South Carolina